Snowshoe running, or snowshoeing, is a winter sport practiced with snowshoes, which is governed by World Snowshoe Federation (WSSF) founded in 2010, which until 2015 had its name International Snowshoe Federation (ISSF). The snowshoes running is part of the Special Olympics and Arctic Winter Games programs.

International federations
The World Snowshoe Federation (WSSF) is the global governing body of snowshoe running recognized by the International Olympic Committee.

World championships
WSSF organized the World Snowshoe Championships in 2016 in Vezza d'Oglio, Italy and in 2017 in Saranac Lake, NY from 24 February to 25 February 2017, until the previous edition, the ISSF 2015 World Snowshoe Championships, held in Quebec City, Canada, the championships were organized by the same International federation, but with old name of ISSF.

See also
They are also used in winter triathlon
Cross country running
Mountain running
Trail running
Skyrunning

References

External links
 World Snowshoe Federation (WSSF) official web site
 Snowshoe Magazine web site